Toxoptera is a genus of true bugs belonging to the family Aphididae.

The species of this genus are found in Australia.

Species:
 Toxoptera hsui Hsu, 1980 
 Toxoptera schlingeri Tao, 1961

References

Aphidini
Hemiptera genera